IZM is a South Korean online magazine that publishes pop music reviews, articles, and interviews with artists. It was founded in August 2001 by music critic Im Jin-mo  and is edited by music critic Jang Jun-hwan.

References

External links
 

South Korean music websites
Internet properties established in 2001
Music review websites
Online music magazines